Wood is an unincorporated community in the U.S. state of Pennsylvania; portions of the community lie in Bedford, Fulton, and Huntingdon counties. Wood has a post office with ZIP code 16694, which opened on September 9, 1908.

References

Unincorporated communities in Bedford County, Pennsylvania
Unincorporated communities in Fulton County, Pennsylvania
Unincorporated communities in Huntingdon County, Pennsylvania
Unincorporated communities in Pennsylvania